The 1986 Michigan Secretary of State election was held on November 4, 1986. Incumbent Democrat Richard H. Austin defeated Republican nominee Weldon Yeager with 70.2% of the vote.

General election

Candidates
Major party candidates
Richard H. Austin, Democratic
Weldon Yeager, Republican
Brian Wright, Independent

Results

References

1986 Michigan elections
Michigan Secretary of State elections
Michigan
November 1986 events in the United States